Nordly "Cap" Capi (born July 11, 1992) is an American football defensive end who is currently a free agent. He played college football at Akron. He was signed by the Jacksonville Jaguars as an undrafted free agent in 2015.

Professional career

Jacksonville Jaguars
Capi was signed by the Jacksonville Jaguars as an undrafted free agent on May 11, 2015. He was waived on September 4, 2015.

Baltimore Ravens
On October 20, 2015, Capi was signed to the Baltimore Ravens' practice squad. He was released on November 10, 2015 but was later re-signed on December 21, 2015. He was released on May 13, 2016.

Atlanta Falcons
On June 7, 2016, Capi was signed by the Atlanta Falcons. He was waived on September 2, 2016 and was signed to the practice squad the next day. He was released on September 20, 2016.

Arizona Cardinals
On October 3, 2016, Capi was signed to the Arizona Cardinals' practice squad. On January 3, 2017, he signed a future contract with the Cardinals. He was waived on September 2, 2017.

New York Giants
On September 4, 2017, Capi was signed to the New York Giants' practice squad. He was promoted to the active roster on September 28, 2017. He was placed on injured reserve on October 31, 2017 with a hamstring injury. He was released on November 10, 2017.

Buffalo Bills
On November 21, 2017, Capi was signed to the Buffalo Bills' practice squad. He was promoted to the active roster on December 5, 2017. On April 17, 2018, Capi was waived by the Bills.

Arizona Cardinals (second stint)
On August 2, 2018, Capi signed with the Arizona Cardinals. Despite leading the preseason with four sacks, Capi was waived by the Cardinals on September 1, 2018.

References

1992 births
Living people
Akron Zips football players
Jacksonville Jaguars players
Baltimore Ravens players
Atlanta Falcons players
Arizona Cardinals players
New York Giants players
Buffalo Bills players